Iqbal Singh may refer to:

 Iqbal Singh (academic), academician in the fields of international relations, human rights and law
 Iqbal Singh (politician) (born 1945), lieutenant governor of Puducherry, India
 Iqbal Singh (spiritual leader) (born 1926), socio-spiritual leader of the Sikh community
 Iqbal Singh (Lok Sabha member), member of Indian parliament